Els Decottenier (born 7 September 1968) is a former Belgian racing cyclist. She won the Belgian national road race title in 1995.

References

External links

1968 births
Living people
Belgian female cyclists
People from Zwevegem
Cyclists from West Flanders